The ECOWAS Peace Pageant  (not to be confused with Miss ECOWAS/CEDEAO) is an annual international beauty pageant established in 2008 for promoting peace and the youth agenda of the ECOWAS Commission to the global community. It is open to delegates from the 15 member-states of the Economic Community of West African States (ECOWAS )/Communauté Économique Des États de l'Afrique de l'Ouest/Comunidade Económica dos Estados da África Ocidental  (CEDEAO). However, since each country sends two delegates, the pageant membership is 30.

The current Ecowas Peace Ambassador is Zirra Banu from Nigeria who was crowned in Port Harcourt on Friday, 14 December 2012.

The venue for the pageant is selected by the ECOWAS Peace Pageant organization and the ECOWAS commission based on which country offering optimal support to the organization is chosen.

The pageant winner is expected to spend one year to champion the cause for the pageant organisation's official charity, and avail herself for all fund-raising events.

History
The Miss ECOWAS Peace Pageant is organised by 702 Productions Ltd., an Accra-based events management company, under the auspices of the ECOWAS Commission. It is intended to promote peace and the youth agenda of the ECOWAS Commission to the global community.

Titleholders

References 

International beauty pageants
Recurring events established in 2008